San Isidro de El General is the first district of the canton of Pérez Zeledón, in the southern part of the province of San José in Costa Rica, as well as the name of said district's main city.

San Isidro de El General is the most populous city in the Brunca region. It is located at 130 km from San José and 212 km from Paso Canoas, a border town with Panama.

Geography 
San Isidro de El General has an area of  km² and an elevation of  metres.

Demographics 

For the 2011 census, San Isidro de El General had a population of  inhabitants.
All of the population is Christian Catholic.

Transportation

Road transportation 
The district is covered by the following road routes:
 National Route 2
 National Route 242
 National Route 243
 National Route 325
 National Route 328
 National Route 334

Culture

Music
The  (Symphonic Music School of Pérez Zeledón) is located in the district. This institution is sponsored by the National University of Costa Rica through its Brunca region campus. The National University developed the idea in 1992 and by holding several fundraisers were able to establish the school; which was inaugurated in 1994 with forty students and five teachers.

At present, the school is located in a wooden building borrowed from the municipal government. With 12 teachers and 22 teaching assistants, the public school of symphony serves a population of 180 students from ages 5 to 24. Music professionals graduated from this school have become music teachers in the region. Consequently, this project and music itself has helped improve the quality of life of young people.

Cultural center
The city also harbors a cultural complex which serves various purposes for a number of activities such as music concerts and theatrical plays.

Public library
Adjacent to the cultural complex building is the city's public library, which serves as the headquarters of an organization which groups the region's writers. The library is also home to two municipal art schools.

Sports
The city's major football club is Municipal Pérez Zeledón, which plays at the Estadio Municipal Pérez Zeledón. It shares the stadium with AS Puma Generaleña.

References 

Districts of San José Province
Populated places in San José Province